Rodrigo Gaston Cortes (born 6 October 1985) is an Argentinian international rugby union player who plays at prop for the Toronto Arrows of Major League Rugby (MLR). 

He previously played over 100 games for Bristol Rugby between 2012 and 2018; and played for Leicester Tigers.

Rugby Union career

Argentina
Born in Córdoba, Argentina, Cortes worked for his father's haulage company and played for Córdoba Athletic Club.

Europe
Cortes signed for Bristol Rugby on 29 August 2012.  Cortes played over 100 games for Bristol, including winning promotion from the RFU Championship twice.

After six seasons at Bristol Cortes signed for Leicester Tigers on 18 May 2018 with the move to happen in the summer of 2018.

On 10 February 2020, it was announced that Garston would join Glasgow Warriors on a short-term loan.

Major League Rugby
In July 2020 it was confirmed that Cortes had signed for Major League Rugby side Toronto Arrows ahead of the 2021 season.

References

Argentine rugby union players
1985 births
Living people
Bristol Bears players
Rugby union props
Leicester Tigers players
Glasgow Warriors players
Argentina international rugby union players
Toronto Arrows players
Sportspeople from Córdoba, Argentina